

Events

January

 January 1
 Greece enters the European Economic Community, predecessor of the European Union.
 Palau becomes a self-governing territory.
 January 10 – Salvadoran Civil War: The FMLN launches its first major offensive, gaining control of most of Morazán and Chalatenango departments.
 January 15 – Pope John Paul II receives a delegation led by Polish Solidarity leader Lech Wałęsa at the Vatican.
 January 20 – Iran releases the 52 Americans held for 444 days, minutes after Ronald Reagan is sworn in as the 40th President of the United States, ending the Iran hostage crisis.
 January 21 – The first DeLorean automobile, a stainless steel sports car with gull-wing doors, rolls off the production line in Dunmurry, Northern Ireland.
 January 24 – An earthquake of  magnitude in Sichuan, China, kills 150 people. Japan suffers a less serious earthquake on the same day.
 January 25 – In South Africa the largest part of the town Laingsburg is swept away within minutes by one of the strongest floods ever experienced in the Great Karoo.
 January 27 – The Indonesian passenger ship Tamponas 2 catches fire and capsizes in the Java Sea, killing 580 people.

February

 February 4 – Gro Harlem Brundtland becomes Prime Minister of Norway.
 February 8 – In Greece, 20 fans of Olympiacos F.C. and 1 fan of AEK Athens die, while 54 are injured, after a stampede at the Karaiskakis Stadium in Piraeus, possibly because Gate 7 does not open immediately after the end of the game.
 February 9 – Polish Prime Minister Józef Pińkowski resigns, and is replaced by General Wojciech Jaruzelski.
 February 14 – Stardust fire: A fire at the Stardust nightclub in Artane, Dublin, Ireland in the early hours kills 48 people and injures 214.
 February 17–22 – Pope John Paul II visits the Philippines.
 February 23 – 1981 Spanish coup d'état attempt ("23-F"): Antonio Tejero, with members of the Guardia Civil, enters the Spanish Congress of Deputies and stops the session where Leopoldo Calvo-Sotelo is about to be named president of the government. The coup fails after being denounced by King Juan Carlos.
 February 24 – A powerful,  magnitude earthquake hits Athens, killing 22 people, injuring 400 people and destroying several buildings and 4,000 houses, mostly in Corinth and the nearby towns of Loutraki, Kiato and Xylokastro.

March

 March 1 – 1981 Irish hunger strike: Bobby Sands, a Provisional Irish Republican Army member, begins a hunger strike for political status at HM Prison Maze (Long Kesh) in Northern Ireland, dying on May 5, the first of 7 IRA and 3 INLA hunger strikers to die.
 March 11 – Chilean military dictator Augusto Pinochet is sworn in as President of Chile for another 8-year term.
 March 17 – In Italy the Propaganda Due Masonic lodge is discovered.
 March 19 – Two or three workers are killed and 4 injured during a ground test of Space Shuttle Columbia at Kennedy Space Center in the United States.
 March 29 – The first London Marathon starts, with 7,500 runners.
 March 30 – Attempted assassination of Ronald Reagan: U.S. President Ronald Reagan is shot in the chest outside a Washington, D.C. hotel by John Hinckley, Jr.; 2 police officers and Press Secretary James Brady are also wounded.

April

 April 4 – UK pop group Bucks Fizz's song Making Your Mind Up wins the 1981 Eurovision Song Contest in Dublin, Republic of Ireland.
 April 11 – 1981 Brixton riot: Rioters in south London, UK, throw petrol bombs, attack police and loot shops.
 April 12 – The Space Shuttle program: Space Shuttle Columbia with NASA astronauts John Young and Robert Crippen launches on the STS-1 mission, returning to Earth on April 14. It is the first time a crewed reusable spacecraft has returned from orbit.
 
 April 15 – The first Coca-Cola bottling plant in China is opened.
 April 18 – A Minor League Baseball game between the Rochester Red Wings and the Pawtucket Red Sox at McCoy Stadium in Pawtucket, Rhode Island, becomes the longest professional baseball game in history: 8 hours and 25 minutes/33 innings (the 33rd inning is not played until June 23).
 April 26 – French presidential election: A first-round runoff results between Valéry Giscard d'Estaing and François Mitterrand.

May

 May – Daniel K. Ludwig abandons the Jari project in the Amazon basin.
 May 1 – Pensions in Chile: The new Chilean pension system, based on private pension funds, begins.
 May 4 – The European Law Students' Association (ELSA) was founded in Vienna by law students from Austria, West Germany, Poland and Hungary.
 May 6 – A jury of architects and sculptors unanimously selects Maya Lin's design for the Vietnam Veterans Memorial in Washington, D.C. from 1,421 other entries.
 May 13 – Pope John Paul II assassination attempt: Pope John Paul II is shot by Mehmet Ali Ağca, a Turkish gunman, as he enters St. Peter's Square in Vatican City to address a general audience. The Pope recovers. 
 May 15 – A prison officer, 31-year-old Donna Payant, disappears at Green Haven Correctional Facility in New York. She is later found to have been murdered by convicted serial killer Lemuel Smith. It is the first time a female prison officer has been killed while on duty in the United States.
 May 21 – François Mitterrand becomes the first socialist President of the French Fifth Republic.
 May 22 – Serial killer Peter Sutcliffe is found guilty and sentenced to life imprisonment on 13 counts of murder and 7 of attempted murder in England.
 May 25 – In Riyadh, the Gulf Cooperation Council is created between Bahrain, Kuwait, Oman, Qatar, Saudi Arabia and the United Arab Emirates.
 May 26 – The Italian government resigns over its links to the fascist Masonic cell Propaganda Due.
 May 30 – Bangladesh President Ziaur Rahman is assassinated in Chittagong.
 May 31 – Burning of Jaffna library, one of the most violent examples of ethnic biblioclasm of the century.

June

 June 5 – The Centers for Disease Control and Prevention in the United States report that 5 homosexual men in Los Angeles have a rare form of pneumonia seen only in patients with weakened immune systems, the first recognized cases of AIDS.
 June 6 – Bihar train disaster: Seven coaches of an overcrowded passenger train fall off the tracks into the Bagmati River in Bihar, India, killing between 500 and 800.
 June 7 – The Israeli Air Force destroys Iraq's Osirak nuclear reactor killing ten Iraqi troops and a French technician.
 June 10 – Alfredo Rampi, a 6-year-old boy, falls into an artesian well in Vermicino, near Rome. After nearly three days of failed rescue attempts followed with bated breath from all over Italy, Alfredino dies inside the well, at a depth of 60 meters.
 June 13 – At the Trooping the Colour ceremony in London, teenager Marcus Sarjeant fires 6 blank shots close to Queen Elizabeth II, startling her horse.
 June 18 
 The Organization of Eastern Caribbean States is founded.
 The Lockheed F-117 Nighthawk Stealth Fighter makes its first flight at Groom Lake (Area 51), Nevada.
 June 22 – Iranian president Abolhassan Banisadr is deposed.
 June 27 
 The first game of paintball is played, in Henniker, New Hampshire, United States.
 The E-mu Emulator sampler keyboard with floppy disk operation is unveiled at NAMM international Sound & Music Expo, Chicago. Production Model Serial Number 001 is issued to Stevie Wonder.

July

 July 1 – Wonderland murders: The Wonderland Gang of cocaine dealers is brutally murdered in Los Angeles. Eddie Nash is suspected of involvement, but will never be convicted.
 July 3 – The Toxteth riots in Liverpool, England, start after a mob saves a youth from being arrested. Shortly afterward, the Chapeltown riots in Leeds start after increased racial tension.
 July 7 – United States President Ronald Reagan nominates the first woman, Sandra Day O'Connor, to the Supreme Court of the United States.
 July 9 – Donkey Kong is released, marking the first Donkey Kong and Mario smash hit arcade game developed by Nintendo in Japan.
 July 10
 Mahathir bin Mohamad becomes the 4th Prime Minister of Malaysia.
 1981 Handsworth riots in Birmingham begin, followed by further 1981 England riots in several urban areas including Liverpool and Leeds.
 July 16–21 – England become the first team this century to win a cricket Test match after the follow-on when they beat Australia by 18 runs at Headingley cricket ground, Leeds, England.
 July 17
 Hyatt Regency walkway collapse: Two skywalks filled with people at the Hyatt Regency Hotel in Kansas City, Missouri, collapse into a crowded atrium lobby, killing 114.
 Israeli aircraft bomb Beirut, destroying multi-story apartment blocks containing the offices of PLO associated groups, killing approximately 300 civilians and resulting in worldwide condemnation and a U.S. embargo on the export of aircraft to Israel.
 July 19 – The 1981 Springbok Tour commences in New Zealand, amid controversy over the support of apartheid.
 July 21 – Panda Tohui is born in Chapultepec Zoo in Mexico City, the first panda to ever be born and survive in captivity outside of China.
 July 29 – A worldwide television audience of over 750 million people watch the Wedding of Prince Charles and Lady Diana Spencer at St Paul's Cathedral in London, UK.
 July 30 – 1981 Polish hunger demonstrations: As many as 50,000 demonstrators, mostly women and children, take to the streets in Łódź to protest about food ration shortages in Communist Poland.

August

 August 1 – The first 24-hour video music channel MTV (Music Television) is launched in the United States and airs its first video, Video Killed the Radio Star by The Buggles.
 August 9 – 1981 Major League Baseball strike ends in the United States, and Major League Baseball resumes with the All-Star Game in Cleveland's Municipal Stadium.
 August 12 – The original Model 5150 IBM PC (with a 4.77 MHz Intel 8088 processor) is released in the United States at a base price of $1,565.
 August 19 – Gulf of Sidra incident: Libyan president Muammar Gaddafi sends two Sukhoi Su-22 fighter jets to intercept two U.S. Navy fighters over the Gulf of Sidra. The U.S. jets destroy the Libyan fighters.
 August 23 – South African troops attack SWAPO bases in Xangongo and Ongiva, Angola, during Operation Protea.
 August 24 – Mark David Chapman is sentenced to 20 years to life in prison after pleading guilty to murdering John Lennon in Manhattan eight months earlier.
 August 27 – North Korea fires a surface-to-air missile at a U.S. SR-71 Blackbird spy plane flying in South Korean and international airspace. The missile misses and the airplane is unharmed.
 August 30 – 1981 Iranian Prime Minister's office bombing: Eight people, including the country's president and prime minister, are killed when a briefcase, planted by People's Mujahedin of Iran, explodes in the building.
 August 31 – A bomb explodes at the United States Ramstein Air Base in West Germany, injuring 20 people.

September

 September – Little Miss Bossy, the first book in the Little Miss series (of the female versions of Mr. Men) is first published.
 September 1 – Gregorio Conrado Álvarez is inaugurated as a military de facto President of Uruguay.
 September 4 – An explosion at a mine in Záluží, Czechoslovakia, kills 65 people.
 September 7 –  British plantation company, Guthrie was taken over by the Malaysian government after successfully purchasing shares to become the major shareholder. This is famously called the 'Dawn Raid attack'.
 September 10 – Picasso's painting Guernica is moved from New York to Madrid.
 September 15
 Our Lady of Akita in Japan cries for the last time, on the Feast of Our Lady of Sorrows.
 The John Bull becomes the oldest operable steam locomotive in the world, at 150 years old, when it operates under its own power outside Washington, D.C.
 September 17 – Ric Flair defeats Dusty Rhodes to win his first World Heavyweight Wrestling Championship in Kansas City.
 September 18 – France's National Assembly votes to abolish Capital punishment in France.
 September 19 – Solidarity Day march, in support of organized labor, draws approximately 250,000 people in Washington, D.C.
 September 20 – The overcrowded ferry boat Sobral Santos II capsizes in the Amazon River, Óbidos, Brazil, killing at least 300 people.
 September 21 – Belize, formerly British Honduras, gains its independence from the United Kingdom.
 September 25 – Sandra Day O'Connor takes her seat as the first female justice of the U.S. Supreme Court.
 September 26
 The Boeing 767 airliner makes its first flight.
 The Sydney Tower opens to the public in Australia.
 September 27 – TGV high-speed rail service between Paris and Lyon, France, begins.
 September 27–29 – Iran–Iraq War: Iranian forces break the Siege of Abadan in Operation Samen-ol-A'emeh.

October

 October 5 – Raoul Wallenberg becomes a posthumously honorary citizen of the United States.
 October 10 – The Ministry for Education of Japan issues the jōyō kanji.
 October 14 – Vice President Hosni Mubarak is elected President of Egypt, one week after the assassination of Anwar Sadat during a parade, by servicemen who belong to the Egyptian Islamic Jihad organization led by Khalid Islambouli and oppose his negotiations with Israel.  
 October 16 – Gas explosions at a coal mine at Hokutan, Yūbari, Hokkaidō, Japan, kill 93 people.
 October 21 – Andreas Papandreou becomes Prime Minister of Greece.
 October 22 – The founding congress of the Nepal Workers and Peasants Organization faction led by Hareram Sharma and D. P. Singh begins.
 October 27 – Soviet submarine S-363 runs aground outside the Karlskrona, Sweden, military base, leading to a minor international incident.

November

 November 1 – Antigua and Barbuda gain independence from the United Kingdom.
 November 9 – Slavery in Mauritania is abolished by Edict No. 81-234.
 November 12 – The Church of England General Synod votes to admit women to holy orders.
 November 22 – The Edmonton Eskimos (14-1-1) barely stave off defeat and win a record 4th consecutive Grey Cup in the Canadian Football League, at the 69th Grey Cup at Montréal's Olympic Stadium defeating the Ottawa Rough Riders (5-11-0) 26–23 in the final three seconds; after being down 20–1 at halftime.
 November 23
 Iran–Contra affair: U.S. President Ronald Reagan signs the top secret National Security Decision Directive 17 (NSDD-17), authorizing the Central Intelligence Agency to recruit and support Contra rebels in Nicaragua.
 1981 United Kingdom tornado outbreak, the largest recorded tornado outbreak in European history.
 November 25–26 – 1981 Seychelles coup d'état attempt: A group of mercenaries led by Mike Hoare take over Mahe airport. Most of them escape by a commandeered Air India passenger jet; six are later arrested.

December

 December 1 – An Inex-Adria Aviopromet McDonnell Douglas MD-80 strikes a mountain peak and crashes while approaching Ajaccio Airport in Corsica, killing all 180 people on board.
 December 4 – South Africa grants Ciskei independence, not recognized outside South Africa.
 December 7 – Rotary International charters the Rotary Club of Grand Baie, Mauritius.
 December 8
 The No. 21 Mine explosion in Whitwell, Tennessee kills 13.
 Arthur Scargill becomes President-elect of the National Union of Mineworkers (Great Britain).
 December 10 – During the Ministerial Session of the North Atlantic Council in Brussels, Spain signs the Protocol of Accession to NATO.
 December 11
 Boxing: Muhammad Ali loses to Trevor Berbick; this proves to be Ali's last-ever fight.
 El Mozote massacre: In El Salvador, army units kill 900 civilians.
 December 13 – Wojciech Jaruzelski declares martial law in Poland, to prevent the dismantling of the communist system by Solidarity.
 December 15 – 1981 Iraqi embassy bombing in Beirut: An Islamic Dawa Party car bomb destroys the Iraqi Embassy in Lebanon, killing 61 people in one of the earliest significant postwar suicide attacks.
 December 17 – American Brigadier General James L. Dozier is kidnapped in Verona by the Italian Red Brigades.
 December 20 – The Penlee lifeboat disaster: While attempting to rescue those on board the Union Star off the coast of South-West Cornwall (England), the lifeboat Solomon Browne is lost with all crew. Sixteen people in all are killed.
 December 28 – The first American test-tube baby, Elizabeth Jordan Carr, is born in Norfolk, Virginia.
 December 31 – A coup d'état in Ghana removes President Hilla Limann's PNP government and replaces it with the PNDC led by Flight Lieutenant Jerry Rawlings.

Date unknown
 January to March – Heavy snow causes many houses and buildings to collapse in northwestern Japan; 152 are killed.
 Cuba suffers a major outbreak of dengue fever, with 344,203 cases.
 Use of crack cocaine, a smokeable form of the drug, first reported in the United States and Caribbean.
 Luxor AB presents the ABC 800 computer.
 Polybius, an urban legend game, is said to have been released in Portland, Oregon; there is no evidence for its existence.
 The State Council of the People's Republic of China lists the cities of Beijing, Hangzhou, Suzhou and Guilin as those where the protection of historical and cultural heritage, as well as natural scenery, should be treated as a priority project.
 Pepsi enters China.
 China becomes the first country to ever reach a population of 1 billion around the end of 1981.

Births

January

 January 1
 Mladen Petrić, Croatian football player
 Eden Riegel, American actress
 January 2 – Maxi Rodríguez, Argentine footballer
 January 3 – Eli Manning, American football player
 January 4 – Zhang Jiewen, Chinese badminton player
 January 5 – Deadmau5 (Joel Zimmerman), Canadian DJ/producer
 January 6 – Rinko Kikuchi, Japanese actress
 January 8
 Xie Xingfang, Chinese badminton player
 Genevieve Cortese, American actress
 January 9 
 Julia Dietze, French born-German actress
 Euzebiusz Smolarek, Polish footballer
 January 10 – 
 Jared Kushner, American investor
 Chris Pozniak, Canadian footballer
 January 11 
 Jamelia, British singer
 Lee Hyo-jung, South Korean badminton player
 January 15
 Howie Day, American singer
 El Hadji Diouf, Senegalese footballer
 Pitbull, American hip-hop musician and record producer
 January 17 – Ray J, American rapper and singer
 January 18 – Olivier Rochus, Belgian tennis player
 January 19 
 Lucho González, Argentine footballer
 Elizabeth Tulloch, American actress
 January 20
 Owen Hargreaves, Canadian-born English footballer
 Jason Richardson, American basketball player
 January 21 – Izabella Miko, Polish actress and dancer
 January 25
 Alicia Keys, American singer, pianist and actress
 Toše Proeski, Macedonian singer (d. 2007)
 January 26 – Gustavo Dudamel, Venezuelan conductor
 January 27
 Yaniv Katan, Israeli footballer
 Alicia Molik, Australian tennis player
 January 28 
 Marko Babić, Croatian football player and coach
 Elijah Wood, American actor and producer
 January 29 – Tenoch Huerta, Mexican actor
 January 30 – Dimitar Berbatov, Bulgarian footballer
 January 31
 Gemma Collins, English media personality and businesswoman
Justin Timberlake, American actor and musician

February

 February 2 – Emily Rose, American actress
 February 3 – Ben Sigmund, New Zealand footballer
 February 4
 Paulien van Deutekom, Dutch speed skater (d. 2019)
 Fahmi Fadzil, Malaysian politician
 February 5 
 Sara Foster, American actress
 Nora Zehetner, American actress
 February 8
 Emanuele Birarelli, Italian volleyball player
 Dawn Olivieri, American actress
 Jim Parrack, American actor
 February 9 
 Tom Hiddleston, British actor
 Tian Jia, Chinese beach volleyball player
 February 10
 Uzo Aduba, American actress
 Cho Yeo-jeong, South Korean actress
 Natasha St-Pier, Canadian singer
 Holly Willoughby, English television presenter
 February 11
 Kelly Rowland, American singer and actress
 Edoardo Molinari, Italian golfer
 February 12 – Selena Li, Hong Kong actress
 February 17
 Joseph Gordon-Levitt, American actor and film director
 Paris Hilton, American model, heiress, and socialite
 February 18 – Andrei Kirilenko, Russian basketball player
 February 20 – Majandra Delfino, Venezuelan born-American singer and actress
 February 23 – Josh Gad, American actor, comedian, and singer
 February 24 – Lleyton Hewitt, Australian tennis player
 February 25 
 Park Ji-sung, South Korean footballer
 Shahid Kapoor, Indian actor
Manuel Garcia-Rulfo, Mexican actor
 February 27
 Josh Groban, American singer
 Mat Yeung, Hong Kong actor

March

 March 1 – Will Power, Australian racing driver
 March 2 – Bryce Dallas Howard, American actress
 March 3
 Julius Malema, South African politician
 László Nagy, Hungarian handball player
 March 5 – Hanna Alström, Swedish actress
 March 9 – Li Na, Chinese fencer
 March 10 – Samuel Eto'o, Cameroonian footballer 
 March 12 – Kenta Kobayashi, Japanese professional wrestler
 March 11 – Matthias Schweighöfer, German actor, director and producer 
 March 12 – Katarina Srebotnik, Slovenian tennis player
 March 15 – Young Buck, American rapper
 March 16 – Fabiana Murer, Brazilian pole vaulter
 March 17 – Kyle Korver, American basketball player
 March 18 
 Tora Berger, Norwegian biathlete
 Fabian Cancellara, Swiss road bicycle racer
 March 19 – Kolo Touré, Ivorian football player
 March 23 – Maria Malmer Stenergard, Swedish politician
 March 26 
 Luke Ford, Canadian-Australian actor 
 Jay Sean, British singer
 March 27 
 Cacau, Brazilian born-German footballer
 Chen Yan, Chinese swimmer
 March 28 
 Dan Petronijevic, Canadian actor
 Julia Stiles, American actress
 March 29 – Megan Hilty, American actress and singer
 March 30 – Park Ji-sung, South Korean fooballer
 March 31 – Maarten van der Weijden, Dutch Olympic swimmer

April

 April 1
 Aslı Bayram, Turkish German model and actress
 Aimee Chan, Chinese-Canadian actress
 Nolan Yonkman, Canadian hockey player
 April 2 – Kapil Sharma, Indian stand- up comedian and actor
 April 7 
 Óscar Alberto Pérez, Venezuelan rebel leader and detective (d. 2018)
Suzann Pettersen, Norwegian golfer
 April 8
 Frédérick Bousquet, French swimmer
 Taylor Kitsch, Canadian actor and model
 Ofer Shechter, Israeli actor
 April 9 – Milan Bartovič, Slovak hockey player
 April 11 
Alessandra Ambrosio, Brazilian model
Luis Flores, Dominican basketball player
 April 12 – Tulsi Gabbard, American politician
 April 16 – Russell Harvard, deaf American actor
 April 18
 Jang Na-ra, Korean actress and singer
 Audrey Tang, Taiwanese software programmer
 April 19
 Hayden Christensen, Canadian-American actor
 Catalina Sandino Moreno, Colombian actress
 April 22 – Marta Larralde, Spanish actress
 April 23 – Seka Aleksić, Bosnian born-Serbian singer
 April 25
 Felipe Massa, Brazilian racing driver
 Anja Pärson, Swedish alpine skier
 Krzysztof Tuduj, Polish politician
 April 26 – Matthieu Delpierre, French football player
 April 28 – Jessica Alba, American actress and businesswoman
 April 29 – Kunal Nayyar, British-Indian actor

May

 May 1 – Alexander Hleb, Belarusian football player
 May 5 – Craig David, English singer
 May 8 
 Stephen Amell, Canadian actor
 Andrea Barzagli, Italian footballer
 May 11
 Lauren Jackson, Australian basketball player
 Daisuke Matsui, Japanese football player
 May 12
 Rami Malek, American actor
 Kentaro Sato, Japanese composer
 May 13 
 Sunny Leone, Canadian-American-Indian model and actress
 Rebecka Liljeberg, Swedish actress
 May 15
 Patrice Evra, Senegalese-born French footballer
 Jamie-Lynn Sigler, American actress
 Zara Tindall, British elite equestrienne
 May 16 – Joseph Morgan, English actor
 May 17 – Shiri Maimon, Israeli pop/R&B singer, TV show host and actress
 May 18 – Mahamadou Diarra, Malian footballer
 May 19
 Sani Bečirovič, Slovenian basketball player
 Bong Tae-gyu, South Korean actor
 Klaas-Erik Zwering, Dutch swimmer
 Georges St-Pierre, Canadian mixed martial arts fighter
 May 20
 Iker Casillas, Spanish footballer
 Rachel Platten, American singer-songwriter
 Mark Winterbottom, Australian racing driver
 May 21 – Anna Rogowska, Polish pole vaulter
 May 22
 Eric Butorac, American tennis player
 Bryan Danielson, American professional wrestler
 Jürgen Melzer, Austrian tennis player
 May 23 
 Dessa, American Doomtree singer
 Janine Wissler, German politician
 May 24 – Penny Taylor, Australian basketball player
 May 25 – Logan Tom, American volleyball player
 May 26 – Anthony Ervin, American swimmer
 May 27 – Alina Cojocaru, Romanian ballerina
 May 29
 Justin Chon, American actor
 Andrey Arshavin, Russian football player
 May 31 – Daniele Bonera, Italian football player and coach

June

 June 1
 Brandi Carlile, American singer and songwriter
 Amy Schumer, American comedian, actress, and screenwriter 
 June 3 – Mike Adam, Canadian curler
 June 4
 T.J. Miller, American comedian, actor, and screenwriter
 Giourkas Seitaridis, Greek footballer
 Natalia Vodopyanova, Russian basketball player
 June 5 – Sébastien Lefebvre, Canadian musician (Simple Plan)
 June 7
 Larisa Oleynik, American actress
 Anna Kournikova, Russian tennis player
 June 8  
 John James, American politician
 Ashley Biden, American social worker and fashion designer, daughter of U.S. president Joe Biden
 June 9
 Celina Jaitly, Indian actress
 Natalie Portman, Israeli-American actress
 Anoushka Shankar, British musician and daughter of Ravi Shankar
 June 12 – Adriana Lima, Brazilian model
 June 13 
 Guy Demel, French born-Ivorian footballer
 Chris Evans, American actor
 June 14 – Lonneke Engel, Dutch model
 June 15 
 Marie Harf, American politician and journalist
 Emma Snowsill, Australian triathlete
 June 17 – Amrita Rao, Indian actress
 June 18 – Ella Chen, Taiwanese singer
 June 21
 Simon Delestre, French equestrian
 Brandon Flowers, American singer and keyboardist
 June 23 – Joe Taslim, Indonesian actor and martial artist
 June 24 – Júnior Assunção, Brazilian mixed martial artist
 June 25
 Simon Ammann, Swiss ski jumper
 Carlo Prater, Brazilian mixed martial artist
 Sheridan Smith, English actress
 June 27 – Majida Issa, Colombian actress
 June 28 – Mara Santangelo, Italian tennis player
 June 29
 Joe Johnson, American basketball player
 Maria Maya, Brazilian actress
 June 30 
 Vahina Giocante, French actress
 Barbora Špotáková, Czech javelin thrower

July

 July 1 – Orlando Cruz, Puerto Rican boxer
 July 3 – Inés Arrimadas, Spanish politician
 July 4 – Tahar Rahim, French actor
 July 5
 Gianne Albertoni, Brazilian model
 Ryan Hansen, American actor
 July 6
 Omar Naber, Slovenian singer, songwriter and guitar player
 Synyster Gates, American guitarist
 July 7 – MS Dhoni, Indian cricketer
 July 8 – Anastasia Myskina, Russian tennis player
 July 12 – Abigail Spears, American tennis player
 July 13
 Ágnes Kovács, Hungarian swimmer
 Ineta Radēviča, Latvian athlete
 July 15 
 Marius Stankevičius, Lithuanian footballer
 Peter Odemwingie, Nigerian footballer
 July 16 – Maher Zain, Lebanese-Swedish R&B singer, songwriter and music producer
 July 17 – Mélanie Thierry, French actress
 July 18 – Michiel Huisman, Dutch actor, musician and singer-songwriter
 July 19 – Nikki Osborne, Australian actress
 July 21 
 Paloma Faith, English singer, songwriter and actress
 Joaquín, Spanish footballer
 July 22 
 Clive Standen, Northern Irish actor
 Josh Lawson, Australian actor
 July 23 
 Steve Jocz, Sum 41 ex-drummer
 Dmitriy Karpov, Kazakhstani decathlete
 Jarkko Nieminen, Finnish tennis player
 July 24
 Menna Shalabi, Egyptian actress
 Summer Glau, American actress
 Nayib Bukele, 46th President of El Salvador
 July 25 – Finn Bálor (aka Fergal Devitt), Irish professional wrestler
 July 26 – Maicon Douglas Sisenando, Brazilian footballer
 July 27 – Li Xiaopeng, Chinese gymnast
 July 28 – Michael Carrick, English football player and coach
 July 29 – Fernando Alonso, Spanish double Formula 1 world champion
 July 30 
 Nicky Hayden, American motorcycle racer (d. 2017)
 Ira Losco, Maltese singer
 Hope Solo, American soccer player

August

 August 3 – Fikirte Addis, Ethiopian fashion designer
 August 4
 Abigail Spencer, American actress
 Meghan, Duchess of Sussex, American actress and member of the British royal family
 August 5
 Anna Rawson, Australian professional golfer
 Rachel Scott, American murder victim (d.1999)
 Jesse Williams, American actor, director, producer and activist 
 August 6 - Leslie Odom Jr., American actor
 August 8
 Roger Federer, Swiss tennis player
 Harel Skaat, Israeli singer
 August 9 – Li Jiawei, Singaporean Olympic table tennis player
 August 10
 Natsumi Abe, Japanese singer and actress
 Taufik Hidayat, Indonesian badminton player
 August 12
 Djibril Cissé, French footballer
 Steve Talley, American actor
 August 14 
 Scott Lipsky, American tennis player
 Kofi Kingston, Ghanaian professional wrestler
 August 15
 Song Ji-hyo, South Korean actress
 Oh Jin-hyek, South Korean archer
 August 18 
 Jan Frodeno, German triathlete
 Elena Santarelli, Italian model and actress
 August 19 – Nate Burleson, American football player, TV host 
 August 20 – Ben Barnes, English actor (Prince Caspian)
 August 22 – Christina Obergföll, German javelin thrower
 August 24 – Chad Michael Murray, American actor
 August 25 
 Rachel Bilson, American actress
 Jean-Julien Rojer, Dutch tennis player
 August 27 – Patrick J. Adams, Canadian actor and director
 August 29
 Karim Darwish, Egyptian squash player
 Émilie Dequenne, Belgian actress
 Emily Hampshire, Canadian actress
 Jay Ryan, New Zealand actor

September

 September 1 – Park Hyo-shin, Korean singer
 September 4 – Beyoncé, American actress and R&B singer (Destiny's Child)
 September 8 – Jonathan Taylor Thomas, American actor
 September 9
 Julie Gonzalo, Argentine-American actress and producer
 Nancy Wu, Hong Kong actress
 September 10 – Marco Chiudinelli, Swiss tennis player
 September 11 – Andrea Dossena, Italian footballer
 September 12 – Jennifer Hudson, American singer and actress
 September 14
 Jordi Mestre, Spanish actor and model (d. 2020)
 Ashley Roberts, American singer (The Pussycat Dolls)
 Miyavi, Japanese musician
 September 15 – Ben Schwartz, American actor
 September 16
 Fan Bingbing, Chinese actress
 Alexis Bledel, American actress and model
 Sandra Sánchez, Spanish karateka
 September 18 – Jennifer Tisdale, American actress
 September 21 – Feliciano López, Spanish tennis player
 September 23 – Natalie Horler, German singer (Cascada)
 September 25 – Angelo Palombo, Italian footballer
 September 26
 Asuka, Japanese professional wrestler
 Christina Milian, American R&B singer and actress
 Serena Williams, American tennis player
 September 28 – Cecilia Brækhus, Colombian born-Norwegian boxer
 September 29 – Nam Hyun-hee, South Korean fencer
 September 30
 Cecelia Ahern, Irish author, daughter of Bertie Ahern 
 Dominique Moceanu, Romanian-American gymnast

October

 October 1 
 Júlio Baptista, Brazilian footballer
 Roxane Mesquida, French actress
 October 3 – Zlatan Ibrahimović, Swedish footballer
 October 5 – Enrico Fabris, Italian speed skater
 October 7 – Jelena Jensen, American adult actress
 October 8 – Chris Killen, New Zealand footballer
 October 9 – Rupert Friend, English actor
 October 11 – Elizabeth Meriwether, American writer, producer and television showrunner
 October 12 
 Engin Akyürek, Turkish actor 
 Tom Guiry, American actor
 Brian J. Smith, American actor
 Sun Tiantian, Chinese tennis player
 October 15
 Elena Dementieva, Russian tennis player
 Guo Jingjing, Chinese diver
 October 16 – Caterina Scorsone, Canadian actress
 October 17 – Holly Holm, American mixed martial artist
 October 20 – Stefan Nystrand, Swedish swimmer
 October 21 – Nemanja Vidić, Serbian football player
 October 23 
 Daniela Alvarado, Venezuelan actress
 Huo Siyan, Chinese actress
 October 24
 Tila Tequila, Vietnamese-American model 
 Mallika Sherawat, Indian actress
 October 25 – Shaun Wright-Phillips, English footballer
 October 26 – Guy Sebastian, original Australian Idol 2003 singer
 October 28 – Milan Baroš, Czech footballer
 October 29 
 Amanda Beard, American swimmer
 Kate Bedingfield, American White House official; Communications Director
 October 30
 Jun Ji-hyun, South Korean actress
 Ivanka Trump, American businesswoman and advisor to her father, former U.S. president Donald Trump
 October 31 – Frank Iero, American guitarist (My Chemical Romance)

November

 November 2
 Tatiana Totmianina, Russian figure skater
 Ai, Japanese-American singer-songwriter
 Katharine Isabelle, Canadian actress
 November 3 – Diego López, Spanish footballer
 November 5 – Ksenia Sobchak, Russian politician, TV anchor and actress
 November 8 – Joe Cole, English footballer
 November 11
 Natalie Glebova, Russian-born Canadian beauty queen
 Raphael Gualazzi, Italian singer and pianist, Eurovision Song Contest 2011 runner-up
 The Hereditary Grand Duke of Luxembourg
 November 14 – Russell Tovey, British actor
 November 15 – Lorena Ochoa, Mexican golfer
 November 16 - Kate Miller-Heidke, Australian singer, songwriter and actress
 November 17 
 Sarah Harding, English singer, actress and model (d.2021)
 Diogo Morgado, Portuguese actor
 November 18
 Allison Tolman, American actress
 Nasim Pedrad, Iranian-American actress and comedian
 November 19 – Yfke Sturm, Dutch model
 November 20
 Andrea Riseborough, English actress
 Kimberley Walsh, British singer (Girls Aloud)
 November 22 – Song Hye-kyo, South Korean actress
 November 25 
 Xabi Alonso, Spanish footballer
 Jenna and Barbara Bush, twin daughters of former U.S. president George W. Bush
 November 26
 Natasha Bedingfield, British singer-songwriter
 Jon Ryan, Canadian National Football League football player from Regina, Saskatchewan
 November 27 – Bruno Alves, Portuguese footballer
 November 29 – Bakhyt Sarsekbayev, Kazakh Olympic boxer

December

 December 1 – Francia Márquez, Colombian politician, 13th Vice President of Colombia
 December 2 – Britney Spears, American singer-songwriter, choreographer
 December 3
Brian Bonsall, American actor and musician
David Villa, Spanish footballer
 December 6 
 Brittany Pettersen, American politician
 Lior Suchard, Israeli mentalist
 December 8 – Azra Akın, Turkish-Dutch actress, dancer, model and beauty queen who was crowned Miss World 2002
 December 9 
 Mardy Fish, American tennis player
 Dia Mirza, Bollywood actress
 December 11
 Javier Saviola, Argentine soccer player
 Mohamed Zidan, Egyptian footballer
 December 13 – Amy Lee, American pianist/singer-songwriter (Evanescence)
 December 14 – Amber Chia, Malaysian model and actress
 December 15
 Michelle Dockery, British actress
 Roman Pavlyuchenko, Russian football player
 December 16 – Krysten Ritter, American actress, musician, author, and model
 December 17 – Tim Wiese, German footballer
 December 20 – Leo Bertos, New Zealand footballer
 December 21 – Cristian Zaccardo, Italian footballer
 December 24 – Dima Bilan, Russian pop-singer
 December 26 – Nikolai Nikolaeff, Australian actor 
 December 27
 Yuvraj Singh, Indian cricketer
 Emilie de Ravin, Australian actress
 December 28
 Sienna Miller, American-born English actress
 Khalid Boulahrouz, Dutch footballer
 December 29 – Shizuka Arakawa, Japanese figure skater
 December 31 – Deniz Çakır, Turkish actress

Deaths

January

 January 1 
 Kazimierz Michałowski, Polish archaeologist (b. 1901)
 Mauri Rose, American race car champion (b. 1906)
 January 3 
 Princess Alice, Countess of Athlone, the last surviving grandchild of Queen Victoria (b. 1883)
 Marvin Opler, American anthropologist (b. 1914)
 January 5
 Harold Urey, American chemist, Nobel Prize laureate (b. 1893) 
 Lanza del Vasto, Italian-born philosopher, poet and activist (b. 1901)
 January 6 – A. J. Cronin, Scottish novelist (b. 1896)
 January 10
 Katherine Alexander, American actress (b. 1898)
 Richard Boone, American actor (b. 1917)
 January 11 – Beulah Bondi, American actress (b. 1889)
 January 12 – Sir John Nicoll, British colonial governor (b. 1899)
 January 13 – Robert Kellard, American actor (b. 1915)
 January 16 – Bernard Lee, English actor (b. 1908)
 January 19 – Francesca Woodman, American photographer (b. 1958)
 January 21 – Allyn Joslyn, American actor (b. 1901)
 January 23 – Samuel Barber, American composer (b. 1910)
 January 25 – Adele Astaire, American actress (b. 1896)
 January 27 – Léo Collard, Belgian Socialist politician (b. 1902)
 January 29 – Lajos Korányi, Hungarian footballer (b. 1907)
 January 30 – John Gordon, Irish Roman Catholic bishop (b. 1912)
 January 31 – Cozy Cole, American jazz drummer (b. 1909)

February

 February 1
 Wanda Hendrix, American actress (b. 1928)
 Ernst Pepping, German  composer (b. 1901)
 Geirr Tveitt, Norwegian composer (b. 1908)
 February 2 – Hugh Joseph Addonizio, Italian-born American politician and Mayor of Newark (b. 1914)
 February 4 – Mario Camerini, Italian film director and screenwriter (b. 1895)
 February 6 – Frederica of Hanover, Queen Consort of the Hellenes and wife of King Paul of Greece (b. 1917)
 February 7 – Hermann Esser, German journalist and editor of the Nazi newspaper Völkischer Beobachter (b. 1900) 
 February 9
 Bill Haley, American rock musician, member of Bill Haley & The Comets (b. 1925)
 Jack Z. Anderson, U.S. Representative from California (b. 1904)
 February 10 – Hubert Shirley-Smith, British civil engineer (b. 1901)
 February 12 – Bruce Fraser, 1st Baron Fraser of North Cape, British admiral (b. 1888)
 February 15 
 Karl Richter, German conductor (b. 1926)
 Mike Bloomfield, American blues guitarist (b. 1943)
 February 18
 John Knudsen Northrop, American airplane manufacturer (b. 1895)
 Ibrahim Abdel Hady Pasha, Egyptian politician, 28th Prime Minister of Egypt (b. 1896)
 February 20
 Bernard B. Brown, American sound engineer and composer (b. 1898)
 Baron Nicolas de Gunzburg, French magazine editor and playboy (b. 1904)
 February 22
 Michael Maltese, American screenwriter (b. 1908)
 Curtis Bernhardt, German film director (b. 1899)
 Ilo Wallace, wife of Henry A. Wallace, Second Lady of the United States (b. 1888)
 February 25
 Leonard Howell, Founder of Rastafari (b. 1898)
 Gunichi Mikawa, Japanese admiral (b. 1888)
 February 26 – Howard Hanson, American composer (b. 1896)
 February 27 – Jacob H. Gilbert, American politician (b. 1920)

March

 March 1 – Roberto Francisco Chiari Remón, 14th President of Panama (b. 1903)
 March 4 – Torin Thatcher, American actor (b. 1905)
 March 5 – Yip Harburg, American lyricist (b. 1896)
 March 6 – George Geary, English cricketer (b. 1893)
 March 7
 Peter Birch, Irish Roman Catholic bishop (b. 1911)
 Kirill Kondrashin, Russian conductor (b. 1914)
 Hilde Krahwinkel Sperling, German-Danish tennis player (b. 1908)
 March 9 – Max Delbrück, German biologist, recipient of the Nobel Prize in Physiology or Medicine (b. 1906)
 March 10 – Flavio Calzavara, Italian director and screenwriter (b. 1900)
 March 11 – Kazimierz Kordylewski, Polish astronomer (b. 1903)
 March 14 – Paolo Grassi, Italian actor (b. 1919)
 March 15 – René Clair, French film director (b. 1898)
 March 20 – Gerry Bertier, American college football player (b. 1953)
 March 21 – Mark Donskoy, Russian Soviet film director (b. 1901)
 March 22
 John S. McCain Jr., American admiral (b. 1911)
 Gil Puyat, Filipino businessman and politician, Senator of the Philippines and Senate President (b. 1907)
 March 23
 Sir Claude Auchinleck, British field marshal (b. 1884)
 Mike Hailwood, English motorcycle racer (b. 1940)
 Beatrice Tinsley, English astronomer (b. 1941)
 March 26 – Cyril Dean Darlington, English biologist, geneticist and eugenicist, (b. 1903)
 March 29 – Eric Williams, 1st Prime Minister of Trinidad and Tobago (b. 1911)
 March 30
 Sherman Edwards, American songwriter (b. 1919)
 Douglas Lowe, British Olympic athlete (b. 1902)
 DeWitt Wallace, American magazine publisher (b. 1889)
 March 31 – Frank Tieri, American gangster (b. 1904)

April

 April 3 – Juan Trippe, airline entrepreneur (b. 1899)
 April 5
 Lucile Godbold, American Olympic athlete (b. 1900) 
 Maurice Zbriger, Canadian violinist, composer and conductor (b. 1896)
Bob Hite, American musician (Canned Heat) (b. 1943)
 April 6 – Alfredo Guarini, Italian director, producer and screenwriter (b. 1901)
 April 7 – Norman Taurog, American film director (b. 1899)
 April 8
 Gopal Chandra Bhattacharya, Indian entomologist (b. 1895)
 Omar Bradley, American army general (b. 1893)
 April 12
 Joe Louis, American boxer (b. 1914)
 Hendrik Andriessen, Dutch composer (b. 1892)
 April 13 – Prince Yasuhiko Asaka of Japan (b. 1887)
 April 15 
 John Thach, American naval aviator and admiral (b. 1905)
 Lorenzo Guerrero, former President of Nicaragua (b. 1900)
 April 17 – Ludwik Sempoliński, Polish actor (b. 1899)
 April 18 – James H. Schmitz, German-born writer (b. 1911)
 April 22 – Marcia King, murder victim (b. 1959)
 April 23 
 Nietta Zocchi, Italian actress (b. 1909)
 Josep Pla, Spanish journalist and author (b. 1897)
 April 26
 Jim Davis, American actor (b. 1909)
 Madge Evans, American actress (b. 1909)
 Muhammad Lafir, Sri Lankan snooker player (b. 1930)
 April 27 – John Aspinwall Roosevelt, American businessman and philanthropist (b. 1916)
 April 28 – Cliff Battles, American football player (Boston Redskins) and a member of the Pro Football Hall of Fame (b. 1910)

May

 May 1 – Barry Jones, American actor (b. 1893)
 May 3 – Nargis, Indian actress (b. 1929)
 May 5 – Bobby Sands, Irish republican hunger striker (b. 1954)
 May 6 – Frank O'Grady, Australian public servant (b. 1900)
 May 7 – Hiromichi Yahara, Imperial Japanese Army officer (b. 1902)
 May 8 – Prince Andrei Alexandrovich of Russia (b. 1897)
 May 9
 Nelson Algren, American author (b. 1909)
 Margaret Lindsay, American actress (b. 1910)
 May 11
 Odd Hassel, Norwegian chemist, Nobel Prize laureate (b. 1897)
 Bob Marley, Jamaican singer, songwriter and musician (b. 1945)
 May 12 – Benjamin Sheares, Singaporean politician and professor, 2nd President of Singapore (b. 1907)
 May 13 – Ben Andrews, American actor (b. 1942)
 May 14 – J. Posadas, Argentine politician (b. 1912)
 May 17 – Hugo Friedhofer, German-American film composer (b. 1901)
 May 18
 Eleonore Baur, German Nazi and only woman to participate in Munich Beer Hall Putsch (b. 1885)
 Arthur O'Connell, American actor (b. 1908)
 William Saroyan, American author (b. 1908)
 May 20 – Dositej, Metropolitan of Skopje (b. 1906)
 May 21 – Yuki Shimoda, American actor (b. 1921)
 May 22 – Boris Sagal,  Ukrainian-American television and film director (b. 1923)
 May 23
 George Jessel, American actor (b. 1898)
 Donald Macintyre, British naval officer and naval historian (b. 1904)
 May 24 
 Jaime Roldós Aguilera, 33rd President of Ecuador (b. 1940)
 Jack Warner, British actor (b. 1895)
 May 25
 Rosa Ponselle, American soprano (b. 1897)
 Ruby Payne-Scott, Australian radio astronomer (b. 1912)
 A. Thiagarajah, Sri Lankan Tamil teacher and politician (b. 1916)
 May 28
 John Bryan Ward-Perkins, British archaeologist (b. 1912)
 Mary Lou Williams, American jazz pianist (b. 1910)
 Stefan Wyszyński, Polish Roman Catholic prelate, archbishop and Servant of God (b. 1901)
 May 29 – Soong Ching-ling, Acting head of State of the People's Republic of China (b. 1893)
 May 30
 Don Ashby, Canadian ice hockey player (b. 1955)
 Peter Lindgren, Swedish actor (b. 1915)
 Ziaur Rahman, 7th President of Bangladesh (b. 1936)
 May 31 
 Barbara Ward, Baroness Jackson of Lodsworth, British economist (b. 1914)
 Gyula Lóránt, Hungarian footballer and manager (b. 1923)
 Giuseppe Pella, Italian politician, 31st Prime Minister of Italy (b. 1902)

June

 June 1 – Carl Vinson, American politician (b. 1883)
 June 2 – Rino Gaetano, Italian musician and singer-songwriter (b. 1950)
 June 5 – Miguel Contreras Torres, Mexican actor, director, producer and screenwriter (b. 1899)
 June 10
 Jenny Maxwell, American actress (b. 1941)
 Phelps Phelps, 38th Governor of American Samoa and United States Ambassador to the Dominican Republic (b. 1897)
 June 11 – Botak Chin, Malaysian criminal and gangster (executed) (b. 1951)
 June 12 – Mahmoud Fawzi, Egyptian diplomat and political figure, 35th Prime Minister of Egypt (b. 1900)
 June 13 – George Walsh, American actor (b. 1889)
 June 14 – Sir Ronald Holmes, British government official in Hong Kong (b. 1913)
 June 16 – Sir Thomas Playford, Australian politician, Premier of South Australia (b. 1896)
 June 17 – Sir Richard O'Connor, British general (b. 1889)
 June 19
 Billy Cook, American actor (b. 1928)
 Anya Phillips, American co-founder of New York City's Mudd Club (b. 1955)
 Lotte Reiniger, German-born silhouette animator (b. 1899)
 June 22
 Henri Bouillard, French Jesuit theologian (b. 1908)
 Lola Lane, American actress and singer (b. 1906)
 June 23 – Zarah Leander, Swedish actress and singer (b. 1907)
 June 28
 Mohammad Beheshti, Chief Justice of Iran (b. 1928)
 Terry Fox, Canadian athlete and cancer activist (b. 1958)

July

 July 1
 Marcel Breuer, Hungarian-born American architect (b. 1902)
 George Voskovec, Czech-American actor, writer, dramatist and director (b. 1905)
 July 3 – Ross Martin, American actor (b. 1920)
 July 7 – Qahtan Muhammad al-Shaabi, South Yemenite socialist leader, 1st President of the People's Democratic Republic of Yemen (South Yemen) (b. 1920)
 July 8 – Joe McDonnell, Irish republican hunger striker (b. 1951)
 July 10 – Giorgio De Lullo, Italian actor and director (b. 1921)
 July 16 – Harry Chapin, American singer and songwriter (b. 1942)
 July 27 – William Wyler, American movie director (b. 1902)
 July 28 – Stanley Francis Rother, American priest, martyr, and Blessed (b. 1935)
 July 29 – Robert Moses, American urban planner (b. 1888)
 July 31 – Omar Torrijos, Panamanian leader (b. 1929)

August

 August 1 
 Paddy Chayefsky, American screenwriter (b. 1923)
 Álvaro de Laiglesia, Spanish writer (b. 1922)
 August 2 
 Delfo Cabrera, Argentine athlete (b. 1919)
 Stefanie Clausen, Danish diver (b. 1900)
 August 4 – Melvyn Douglas, American actor (b. 1901)
 August 14 – Karl Böhm, Austrian conductor (b. 1894)
 August 15
 Carlo Buscaglia, Italian football player (b. 1909)
 Karl Gero, Duke of Urach, Lichtenstein noble (b. 1899)
 August 18
 Robert Russell Bennett, American composer and arranger (b. 1894)
 Anita Loos, American screenwriter (b. 1888)
 August 19 – Jessie Matthews, English dancer, singer and actress (b. 1907)
 August 22 – Glauber Rocha, Brazilian filmmaker (b. 1939)
 August 26 – Roger Nash Baldwin, American social activist (b. 1884)
 August 27 – Valeri Kharlamov, Soviet ice hockey player (b. 1948)
 August 28 – Béla Guttmann, Hungarian-born Association footballer and coach (b. 1899)
 August 29 – Lowell Thomas, American writer and broadcaster (b. 1892)
 August 30
 Mohammad-Ali Rajai, 47th Prime Minister of Iran and 2nd President of Iran (assassinated) (b. 1933)
 Mohammad-Javad Bahonar, Iranian theologian and politician, 48th Prime Minister of Iran (assassinated) (b. 1933)
 Vera-Ellen, American actress and dancer (b. 1921)

September

 September 1
 Ann Harding, American actress (b. 1902)
 Albert Speer, German Nazi architect and war minister (b. 1905)
 September 2 – Enid Lyons, Australia politician (b. 1897)
 September 7 – Christy Brown, Irish writer and painter (b. 1932)
 September 8
 Hideki Yukawa, Japanese physicist, Nobel Prize laureate (b. 1907)
 Roy Wilkins, American civil rights activist (b. 1901)
 September 9 
 Jacques Lacan, French psychoanalyst and psychiatrist (b. 1901)
 Ricardo Balbín, Argentine politician, leader of the Radical Civic Union (UCR) (b. 1904)
 Sir Robert (Bob) Askin, Premier of New South Wales (b. 1907)
 September 11 – Frank McHugh, American actor (b. 1898)
 September 12 – Eugenio Montale, Italian writer, Nobel Prize laureate (b. 1896)
 September 14 – Charles L. Melson, American admiral (b. 1904)
 September 15
 Harold Bennett, British actor (b. 1899)
 Rafael Méndez, Mexican-born trumpet virtuoso (b. 1906)
 September 21 – Nigel Patrick, English actor (b. 1912)
 September 22 – Harry Warren, American songwriter (b. 1893)
 September 23 – Chief Dan George, Canadian actor and writer, tribal chief of the Tsleil-Waututh First Nation (b. 1899)
 September 24 – Patsy Kelly, American actress (b. 1910)
 September 27 – Robert Montgomery, American actor and director (b. 1904)
 September 28
 Rómulo Betancourt, 2-time President of Venezuela (b. 1908)
 Sir Edward Boyle, Baron Boyle of Handsworth, British Conservative cabinet minister (b. 1923)
 September 29 
 Javad Fakoori, Iranian military officer, former minister of Defence (b. 1913)
 Mousa Namjoo, Iranian military officer, minister of Defence (b. 1938)
 Bill Shankly, British football manager (b. 1913)

October

 October 2
 Harry Golden, American journalist (b. 1902)
 Hazel Scott, American jazz singer and pianist (b. 1920)
 October 3 – Chrysostom Blashkevich, Soviet Benedict monk (b. 1915)
 October 4 – Freddie Lindstrom, American baseball player (New York Giants) and a member of the MLB Hall of Fame (b. 1905)
 October 5 – Gloria Grahame, American actress (b. 1923)
 October 6 – Anwar Sadat, 37th Prime Minister of Egypt and 3rd President of Egypt, recipient of the Nobel Peace Prize (assassinated) (b. 1918)
 October 13 
 Antonio Berni, Argentine painter (b. 1905)
 Nils Asther, Danish-born actor (b. 1897)
 October 16
 Stanley Clements, American actor (b. 1926)
 Moshe Dayan, Israeli general (b. 1915)
 October 22 – Michael Granger, American actor (b. 1923)
 October 24 – Edith Head, American costume designer (b. 1897)
 October 25 – Barbara Bedford, American actress (b. 1903)
 October 27 – John Warburton, British actor (b. 1899)
 October 29 – Georges Brassens, French singer and songwriter (b. 1921)

November

 November 2 – Wally Wood, American cartoonist (b. 1927)
 November 3 – Jean Eustache, French film director (b. 1938)
 November 7 – Will Durant, American philosopher and writer (b. 1885)
 November 10 – Abel Gance, French film director (b. 1889)
 November 12 – William Holden, American actor (b. 1918)
 November 13 – Gerhard Marcks, German sculptor (b. 1889)
 November 15
 Walter Heitler, German physicist (b. 1904)Fellow of the Royal Society
 Enid Markey, American actress (b. 1894)
 November 22 
 Jack Fingleton, Australian cricketer (b. 1908)
 Hans Adolf Krebs, German physician and biochemist, recipient of the Nobel Prize in Physiology or Medicine (b. 1900)
 November 25 
 Jack Albertson, American actor and comedian (b. 1907)
 Morris Kirksey, American athlete (b. 1895)
 November 26 – Max Euwe, Dutch chess grandmaster (b. 1901)
 November 27 – Lotte Lenya, Austrian singer and actress (b. 1898)
 November 29 – Natalie Wood, American actress (b. 1938)

December

 December 2 – Wallace Harrison, American architect (b. 1895)
 December 6 – Harry Harlow, American psychologist (b. 1905)
 December 7 – William Edmunds, Italian stage and screen character actor (b. 1886)
 December 8 – Ferruccio Parri, Italian partisan and politician, 29th Prime Minister of Italy (b. 1905)
 December 13 – Cornelius Cardew, English composer (b. 1936)
 December 15
 Catherine T. MacArthur, American philanthropist (b. 1909)
 Karl Struss, American cinematographer (b. 1886)
 December 17
 Franz Dahlem, German politician. (b. 1892)
 Mehmet Shehu, Albanian politician, 23rd Prime Minister of Albania (b. 1913)
 December 18 – Enrique Hertzog, Bolivian politician, 42nd President of Bolivia (b. 1896)
 December 23 
 Luther H. Evans, American political scientist and librarian, 3rd Director General of the UNESCO (b. 1902)
 Reginald Miles Ansett, Australian businessman and aviator (b. 1909)
 December 26 – Suat Hayri Urguplu, Turkish politician, 11th Prime Minister of Turkey (b. 1903)
 December 27 – Hoagy Carmichael, American jazz composer (b. 1899)
 December 28 – Allan Dwan, Canadian-born American film director (b. 1885)

Date unknown
 Ahmad Toukan, Prime Minister of Jordan (b. 1903)
 Teófilo Tabanera,  Argentine engineer and air force officer (b. 1909)

Nobel Prizes

 Physics – Nicolaas Bloembergen, Arthur Leonard Schawlow, Kai Siegbahn
 Chemistry – Kenichi Fukui, Roald Hoffmann
 Medicine – Roger Wolcott Sperry, David H. Hubel, Torsten Wiesel
 Literature – Elias Canetti
 Peace – United Nations High Commissioner for Refugees
 Nobel Memorial Prize in Economic Sciences – James Tobin

References

External links

 Protocol of Accession